Melanoscia is a genus of moths in the family Geometridae described by Warren in 1904.

Species
Melanoscia oreades (Druce, 1893) Panama
Melanoscia felina Warren, 1904 Peru

References

Boarmiini